Sydney Blu (born Joanne Judith-Mary Hill; November 22, 1977) is a Canadian DJ, producer, and record label owner. Blu is known for large, live event performances at major venues and dance music festivals around the world and releases on multiple labels, including her own Blu Music. Her singles, "Give It Up For Me" and "Senses and the Mind" broke beatport.com sales records, and launched her label "Blu Music" with her single "Instinct". In January 2019 Blu relocated to Berlin Germany to produce her next studio album and experience Berlin club culture.

History
Blu's career began in her native Canada, where she became a well-known member of the electronic dance music community with shows around the country. She moved to Miami in 2010 and then Los Angeles in 2013 to pursue opportunities in the larger, more established Electronic Music community. Summer 2015 marked her return to her hometown Toronto with the release of her debut album 'Relentless'

In 2009, Sydney Blu founded her own imprint, Blu Music, on the principle of authentic, dancefloor-rich house and techno. The label quickly became a success, producing several chart-topping singles since its creation. On top of that, Sydney has released music on some of the most recognized labels in the industry including Knee Deep in Sound, Mau5trap, VIVa Music, Desert Hearts, Kerri Chandler’s Mad  Tech Records, Kevin Saunderson’s KMS Records and more. Her release "Give It Up For Me" on Mau5trap Recordings was one of  Beatport’s highest selling songs, earning Sydney the rank of first female electronic music producer to have a Top 10 hit on the platform.

Sydney’s success is largely attributed to the relentless touring schedule which she’s upheld over the years. In the spring of 2010, after leaving a long time residency at Toronto’s Guvernment nightclub, Sydney landed a residency in Miami, Florida. Partnering with Opium Group, Sydney became a resident at Mansion Miami, the hottest club in South Beach at that time. Shortly thereafter, Sydney's North American performance schedule grew, headlining such major venues as Output Brooklyn NY, Pacha NYC, Stereo Montreal, Space Miami, Avalon & Exchange Los Angeles, and Beta Denver. Then in November 2011, Sydney performed at the Rogers Centre in Toronto, for the Deadmau5 Meowingtons Hax Tour before 35,000 fans. The evening went down as the largest solo headlining dance event in Canadian history. Since then, Sydney has headlined nightclubs and been on festival lineup’s all over the globe. Last year she played main stage at Electric Island Festival with Green Velvet, The Martinez Brothers, Anna, Archie Hamilton, Danny Daze, Nicole Moudaber, Rodriguez Jr, Ellen Allien, Charlotte De Witte, DJ Tennis and more. In addition, Sydney has played main stage at festivals such as Digital Dreams Toronto, Ever After Festival Waterloo, Evolve Festival Halifax, Burning Man Festival, and Ultra Music Festival Miami. Globally, Sydney Blu has enchanted crowds with performances in Europe, Brazil, Colombia, Asia, Mexico, Tunisia, Pakistan, and Egypt. Reaching even further,  Sydney also hosts 40 radio syndications worldwide, where she connects with audiences through her live mixes and curation.

The Blu Party, having originally launched in 2010 during Miami Music Week, has continued annually and is one of the most anticipated events during the week. Featuring A-list headliners whom support Sydney's underground tone, the Blu Party has featured performances from such names as Pleasurekraft, Riva Starr, Kevin Saunderson, Stacey Pullen, Carlo Lio, Britta Unders, Yousef, Christian Smith, wAFF, Francesca Lombardo, Nathan Barato, Fur Coat, Lee Reynolds of Desert Hearts, De La Swing of El Row, Serge Devant, Doc Martin, Christian Martin, Kenny Glasgow, Joeski, Black Motion and Gene Farris. Following a successful inauguration at Detroit's Movement 2016 weekend and several showcases throughout North America (including a ten-years-running streak at Miami Music Week), the Blu Party is set to continue its underground rein well into 2021 celebrating its ten year anniversary.

After her first solo album, Relentless (2015),  the past 5 years have been huge years for Sydney Blu releases. The Canadian artist released and charted top ten releases throughout the 3 year time span on labels like Hot Since 82’s Knee Deep in Sound, Desert Hearts, Kevin Saunderson’s KMS Records, Elrow, Steve Lawler’s VIVa Music, Supernova’s Lapsus Music, Roger Sanchez’s Under the Rdr and the legendary melodic house label Katermukke, record label of Berlin nightclub Katerblau . Sydney has also been remixed these past few years by Bulgarian techno queen Gallya, tech house legend Pirupa and Deep house chart topper Collective Machine. She has also received play from house & techno giants Nic Fancuilli, Steve Lawler, Carlo Lio, Hot Since 82, Joseph Capriati, Roger Sanchez and many more.

In 2018, Sydney’s first single on Hot Since 82’s Knee Deep in Sound was premiered by Billboard Magazine and climbed to the top of the Beatport Tech house chart. It also was the #1 selling song on Knee Deep in Sound’s ADE Sampler and was featured several times at the world famous Elrow Party. Following this release was another release called ‘Escape’ on the fresh UK label Underground Audio which climbed to #8 in the Top ten on Beatport.

A new album is on the horizon for Sydney Blu, set to be released before the end of 2020.

Discography

Albums
Studio albums
Relentless (2015)

Compilation albums
Change the Game (2013)

Live albums
Live At Mansion (2011)

Singles
Give It Up For Me - March 2008 (mau5trap)
Senses and the Mind - December 2008 (mau5trap)
Instinct - March 2009 (Blu Music)
Panic Attack - May 2009 (with Matteo DiMarr) (Blu Music)
Sleeping Awake - May 2009 (Blu Music)
Lights Out - March 2011 (with Trent Cantrelle and the Manufactured Superstars) (Blu Music)
The Lockout - May 2011 (with Jquintel) (Spinnin')
Devastating (with Damaged Goods) - January 2012 (Blu Music)
Xfactor - February 2012 (Zenbi Recordings)
Chemistry - July 2012 (Blackhole)
Another Late Night feat MC Flipside - October 2012 (Blackhole)
Whiplash (with Damaged Goods) - October 2012 (Funk Farm)
Nightlight feat Betsie Larkin - January 2013 (Blackhole)
Change the Game - April 2013 (Blackhole)
NYCMIA - June 2013 (Black Hole)
Who Gives a #$%? - October 2013 (Hotfingers)
Little Things - Dec 2013 (Blu Music)
Together - June 2014 (Endgame Records)
Motivate - May 2014 (Hotfingers)
My Neighbors Hate Me - November 2014 (Black Hole)
VNDERGROUND/It Doesn't Matter January 2015 (KMS Records)
Need I Say More/You Were the One w/Dramirez - April 2015 (Hotfingers)
Teardrop - April 2015 (Blu Music)
Mad World April 2015 (Pornostar)
Relentless Album - July 27, 2015 (Black Hole)
What's Inside/Centipede - August 2015 (Black Hole)
Electric Era - Dec 2015 (Black Hole)
Stoned/Don't Mess Around - February 2016 (Kinetika)
Too Clean - June 2016 (Toolroom Records)
Eterno/March - September 2016 (Blu Music)
Jackrabbit Ep - December 2016 (Playmobil Records/Material Series)
Momento - January 2017 (VIVa Music)
Rock it Out - March 2017 (Blu Music)
Hella Dope - April 2017 (Kinetika Records)
You Know How it Goes/Incognito - April 2017 (Farris Wheel Recordings)
Throwdown - April 2017 (Farris Wheel Recordings)
You Don't Understand/Catch My Flow - August 2017 (Soup NYC)
Inspirato/Take it Back - August 2017 (Undr The Rdr)
Mind Games - October 2017 (Knee Deep in Sound)
Nanabijou - December 2017 (Maya Recordings)
Do the Math/Plot Twist - March 2018 (SOUP NYC)
On the Brink - March 2018 (Lapsus Music)
Escape/First Few Minutes - June 2018 (Underground Audio)
Runaway - July 2018 (Mad Tech Records)
Espinal & Nova - Be With You (Sydney Blu Remix) - October 2018 (SOUP NYC)
Get Over Yourself - January 2019 (Desert Hearts)
Intuition - December 2019 (KMS Records)
Collective Machine - 90s Run (Sydney Blu Remix) - June 2020 (Collective Music)
Temple - August 2020 (Katermukke)

References

External links

1977 births
Living people
Canadian house musicians
Canadian electronic musicians
Canadian DJs
Women DJs
Remixers
Mau5trap artists
Musicians from Thunder Bay
Canadian women in electronic music
Electronic dance music DJs
Canadian women record producers
21st-century Canadian women musicians